The 1929 Harvard Crimson football team represented Harvard University in the 1929 college football season.  The Crimson were led by fourth-year head coach Arnold Horween.  They played their home games in Harvard Stadium with a capacity crowd of 57,166.

Schedule

References

Harvard
Harvard Crimson football seasons
Harvard Crimson football
1920s in Boston